Lakeside School is a special school with specialist SEN status for boys located in Chandler's Ford, Hampshire, England.

It is a community boarding and day school administered by Hampshire County Council. It educates boys of secondary school age who have statements of special educational needs based primarily on a range of emotional and behavioural difficulties.

The head teacher is Mr Gareth Evans, who has won a 2008 Pearson Teaching Award for head teacher of the year.

Lakeside School is located next to Thornden School.

References

External links 
 

Special schools in Hampshire
Community schools in Hampshire
Boarding schools in Hampshire
Boys' schools in Hampshire
Special secondary schools in England
Specialist SEN colleges in England